United Crushers is the third studio album by Poliça. It was released by Mom + Pop Music on March 4, 2016. It is a follow up to their 2013 album, Shulamith. It was recorded with producer Ryan Olson at the Sonic Ranch studios in El Paso, Texas. The album was named after the Minneapolis based graffiti artists by the same name.

Critical reception
At Metacritic, which assigns a weighted average score out of 100 to reviews from mainstream critics, United Crushers received an average score of 72% based on 19 reviews, indicating "generally favorable reviews".

Track listing

Charts

References

External links
 

2016 albums
Mom + Pop Music albums
Poliça albums
Albums recorded at Sonic Ranch